The Play's the Thing was a Canadian theatrical drama television series which aired on CBC Television in 1974.

Premise
This anthology series was based on Canadian-written plays, especially from new playwrights.

Scheduling
This hour-long series was broadcast Thursdays at 9:00 p.m. (Eastern) from 17 January to 28 March 1974 as follows:

Further reading

References

External links
 
 

CBC Television original programming
1974 Canadian television series debuts
1974 Canadian television series endings
1970s Canadian drama television series